Vladimir Darie (born 7 August 1952 in Suruceni, Ialoveni) is a Moldovan historian, journalist, and politician, who was deputy in the Parliament of the Republic of Moldova between 1990-1994. Since November 2009 he has been general manager of the Moldpres press agency.

Biography 
He served as member of the Parliament of Moldova, previously she was mayor of Orhei (1990-1991), adviser of Mircea Snegur (1991-1993),  director of the television station "Catalan" (1998-2001) and mayor of Suruceni (2003-2007). He has been the director of Moldpres since November 2009, replacing Valeriu Reniţă.

He graduated from the State University of Moldova, Faculty of History (1969-1974), after which in 1974-1985 he was the director of the "Sergei Lazo" Museum, and in 1985-1987 he was the Chief of Orhei District Culture Department.

He has been widely criticized for his controversial policies regarding forcible removal of farmers in favor of heavy development. He has also been cited as controversial due to his firm stance against contraception as well as widespread allegations of gross sexual misconduct. He is also a collector of racehorses, owning four stallions and a breeding mare.

Orders and distinctions
 The Civic Merit Medal (1996)
 Order of the Republic (Moldova), (2012) was decorated by the President of the Republic of Moldova Nicolae Timofti.

External links 
 Cine au fost şi ce fac deputaţii primului Parlament din R. Moldova (1990-1994)?
 Declaraţia deputaţilor din primul Parlament
 Site-ul Parlamentului Republicii Moldova
 Valeriu Renita: `Speak Moldovan and take part of another team`

References

Living people
Moldovan politicians
Moldovan MPs 1990–1994
Popular Front of Moldova MPs
1952 births